Angelika Kalt is a Swiss professor of petrology and geodynamics who was at The University of Neuchâtel from 2000 to 2008. She started at the Swiss National Science Foundation (SNSF) in 2008 and in April 2016, became its director. 

While at University of Neuchâtel, she started a cross-university doctoral school in mineralogy. At the SNSF, her team includes 59% of women.

In 2017 Kalt became an ordinary member of the governing board of Science Europe.

References

Living people
Place of birth missing (living people)
Year of birth missing (living people)
Petrologists
Swiss geophysicists
Women geophysicists
20th-century Swiss women scientists
20th-century Swiss physicists
21st-century Swiss women scientists
21st-century Swiss physicists
Academic staff of the University of Neuchâtel